Lorch may refer to:

People
Edgar Lorch (1907–1990), Swiss American mathematician
Grace Lorch (c. 1903–1974), American teacher and civil rights activist
Karl Lorch (born 1950), American football player
Lee Lorch (1915–2014), American mathematician and civil rights activist
Maristella Lorch, critic of Italian literature
Rudi Lorch (born 1966), German footballer
Thembinkosi Lorch (born 1993), South African footballer
Theodore Lorch (1873–1947), American film actor
Wilhelm Lorch (1867–1954), German botanist

Places
Lorch, Hesse, a town in Hesse, Germany
Lorch (Württemberg), a town in Baden-Württemberg, Germany
Lorch, Austria, part of Enns in Upper Austria

Other uses
"Lorch" (song), by Kabza de Small and DJ Maphorisa, 2009

See also
Lerch, a surname
Lorsch (disambiguation)